Kemar Headley (born 14 December 1993) is a Barbadian footballer who currently plays for the Weymouth Wales as a forward.

Career
In 2010, he began his professional career for the Weymouth Wales. He made his international debut for Barbados in 2012.

International career

International goals
Scores and results list the Barbados's goal tally first.

References

External links

1993 births
Living people
Association football forwards
Barbadian footballers
Barbados international footballers
Weymouth Wales FC players